Stellaria crassifolia, the fleshy starwort, is a species of flowering plant in the carnation family Caryophyllaceae, found in northern North America, Europe, and Asia. Its common Icelandish name is "Stjörnuarfi" (star-weed).

References

crassifolia
Flora of Europe
Taxa named by Jakob Friedrich Ehrhart